Charles Kelly (14 March 1894 – 1969) was an English footballer who played in the Football League for Stoke and Tranmere Rovers.

Career
Kelly was born in Sandbach and played for local side Sandbach Ramblers before he joined Stoke in 1923. He made his debut for Stoke in the Potteries derby against Port Vale at the Victoria Ground on 6 October 1923. He was used as back up behind regular inside forward Harry Davies, and played nine matches during the 1923–24 season scoring once against Southampton. He was more involved in the next season playing seventeen matches scoring four goals but Stoke had a poor performance in the Second Division and were almost relegated. Kelly was released by Stoke in 1926 and joined Tranmere Rovers.

Career statistics

References

1894 births
People from Sandbach
1969 deaths
English footballers
Association football inside forwards
Sandbach Ramblers F.C. players
Tranmere Rovers F.C. players
Stoke City F.C. players
English Football League players